The K-11 is an Armenian sniper rifle chambered for 5.45×39mm ammunition with a manually operated firing system.  It was developed by the Armenian Ministry of Defence Industrial Department.  Little is known about the production and variants of these firearms, as its production is veiled in secrecy.  It is evident that a newer produced model called the K11M is now being used by the Armenian Special Forces.

See also
 K-3 (rifle)

References

Armenian inventions
Firearms of Armenia
Sniper rifles of Armenia
5.45×39mm bolt-action rifles